The individual dressage in equestrian at the 2012 Olympic Games in London was held at Greenwich Park from 2 to 9 August. Great Britain's Charlotte Dujardin won the gold medal and Laura Bechtolsheimer the bronze. The silver was won by Adelinde Cornelissen of the Netherlands.

Competition format

The team and individual dressage competitions used the same results.  Dressage had three phases, with the last being used only for the individual event.  The first phase was the Grand Prix.  Individuals advanced to the second phase, the Grand Prix Special, if they were on one of the top seven teams or were one of the top 11 remaining competitors.  The top 18 competitors in the Grand Prix Special (ignoring Grand Prix scores) advanced to the final phase, the Grand Prix Freestyle.  The results of that phase (again ignoring previous scores) produced final results.

Schedule

All times are British Summer Time (UTC+1)

Results

References

Individual dressage